Castelveccana is a comune (municipality) in the Province of Varese in the Italian region Lombardy, located about  northwest of Milan and about  northwest of Varese. 

Castelveccana borders the following municipalities: Brenta, Casalzuigno, Cittiglio, Ghiffa, Laveno-Mombello, Oggebbio, Porto Valtravaglia.

References

Cities and towns in Lombardy